Meg Froelich is an American politician serving as a member of the Colorado House of Representatives from the 3rd district, which includes Greenwood Village, Colorado. Froelich assumed office on January 14, 2019.

Early life and education 
Froelich is a native of Englewood, Colorado. She earned a Bachelor of Arts degree in history from Bryn Mawr College, followed by Master of Arts in history from the University of Michigan. She earned a teaching credential in secondary education from the Dominican University of California.

Career 
Prior to entering politics, Froelich worked as a producer for CBS News, A&E Networks, and PBS. Forelich was the co-producer, writer, and director of Strong Sisters, a documentary about female legislators in Colorado. She served as director of the Colorado chapter of NARAL Pro-Choice America and executive director of the Colorado Democratic Party.

After incumbent Democrat Jeff Bridges was selected to fill a vacancy in the Colorado Senate, Froelich was appointed to replace him, becoming the member of Colorado House of Representatives for District 3.

Froelich was the lead sponsor of a bill during the 2021 session of the Colorado General Assembly that established a system to regulate surrogacy in the state. Her bill, HB 21-1022, would set criteria for contracts used to engage surrogate mothers for intended parents.

Elections

2020
Froelich ran unopposed in the Democratic primary. In the general election, she defeated Republican Dean Titterington with 59.1% of the vote.

References 

Living people
21st-century American politicians
Democratic Party members of the Colorado House of Representatives
Bryn Mawr College alumni
University of Michigan alumni
People from Englewood, Colorado
Year of birth missing (living people)
Dominican University of California alumni
21st-century American women politicians
Women state legislators in Colorado